István Simon is a Hungarian figure skating coach and former competitor. He won two Hungarian national titles in the early 1980s and competed at the 1980 European Championships in Gothenburg. After retiring from competition, he became a skating coach in Budapest. He is the former coach of Diána Póth, Szabolcs Vidrai, Viktória Pavuk, and Ivett Tóth.

Competitive highlights

References 

Hungarian figure skating coaches
Hungarian male single skaters
Living people
Figure skaters from Budapest
Year of birth missing (living people)